The 2016–17 WKU Lady Toppers basketball team represents Western Kentucky University during the 2016–17 NCAA Division I women's basketball season. The Lady Toppers, led by fourth year head coach Michelle Clark-Heard. They play their home games at E. A. Diddle Arena and were third year members of Conference USA. They finished the season 27–8, 16–2 in C-USA play to win the Conference USA regular season and also won the Conference USA Tournament. They received an automatic bid to the NCAA women's basketball tournament where they were defeated by Ohio State in the first round.

Roster

Schedule

|-
!colspan=9 style="background:#F5002F; color:#FFFFFF;"| Exhibition

|-
!colspan=9 style="background:#F5002F; color:#FFFFFF;"| Non-conference regular season

|-
!colspan=9 style="background:#F5002F; color:#FFFFFF;"| Conference USA regular season

|-
!colspan=9 style="background:#F5002F; color:#FFFFFF;"| Conference USA Women's Tournament

|-
!colspan=9 style="background:#F5002F; color:#FFFFFF;"| NCAA Women's Tournament

Rankings

See also
2016–17 WKU Hilltoppers basketball team

References

Western Kentucky Lady Toppers basketball seasons
WKU
WKU
WKU
Western Kentucky